Sint-Petrus-en-Pauluskerk (Church of Saint Peter and Saint Paul) is a Roman Catholic  church in Ostend, Belgium. The neo-Gothic building was constructed on the ashes of a previous church that occupied the site. King Leopold II enthusiastically supported a plan to build a new and more magnificent church. Construction started in 1899 and was completed and consecrated by Bishop Waffelaert on 31 August 1908. Its stained glass windows were destroyed during the two World Wars and were replaced by windows by Michiel Martens.

The church was built in the neo-Gothic style according to plans by the architect Louis Delacenserie, who based his design on the Gothic Cologne Cathedral and the neo-Gothic Votivkirche in Vienna.

Gallery

External links

 Information and pictures

Gothic Revival church buildings in Belgium
Roman Catholic churches completed in 1908
20th-century Roman Catholic church buildings in Belgium
Churches in West Flanders
Ostend
1908 establishments in Belgium